Marguerite de Sassenage (1424–1470) was a French noblewoman. She was a mistress to King Louis XI of France prior to his succession as king. She had three daughters with Louis XI, who were all acknowledged by him.

References

 Detlev Schwennicke, Europäische Stammtafeln, Band 3.2, Klostermann, Frankfurt am Main 1983, Tafel 305.

1424 deaths
1470 deaths
15th-century French people
Mistresses of French royalty